Patrick Vincent Duffy (1832 – 22 November 1909) was an Irish painter, primarily of landscapes.

Born on Nassau St., Dublin, Duffy was christened "Patrick"; his middle name "Vincent" was taken at confirmation and he used it thereafter. The son of a silversmith and jeweler he received his art education in the school of the Royal Dublin Society. He began to exhibit at the Royal Hibernian Academy in 1851 and became an Associate member on April 18, 1860. He became a full member just a few months later and would be appointed Keeper of the RHA in 1870. Duffy held this post for thirty-eight years, doubling as the Treasurer during the last few years of his life. Almost all of his paintings were restricted to landscapes, though he did some sculpture, exhibiting a model of the Cross at Monasterboice in 1854. Following a long illness, he died on 22 November 1909. He was survived by his wife, Elizabeth, and a daughter.

References

1832 births
1909 deaths
19th-century Irish painters
20th-century Irish painters
Irish male painters
Painters from Dublin (city)
19th-century Irish male artists
20th-century Irish male artists